A rare-cutter enzyme is a restriction enzyme with a recognition sequence which occurs only rarely in a genome.  An example is NotI, which cuts after the first GC of a 5'-GCGGCCGC-3' sequence; restriction enzymes with seven and eight base pair recognition sequences are often also called rare-cutter enzymes (six bp recognition sequences are much more common).

For example, rare-cutter enzymes with 7-nucleotide recognition sites cut once every 47 bp (16,384 bp), and those with 8-nucleotide recognition sites cut every 48 bp (65,536 bp) respectively. They are used in top-down mapping to cut a chromosome into chunks of these sizes on average.

External links
Bio-Medicine.com's definition

Molecular biology
Biotechnology
Restriction enzymes
EC 3.1